John Clavering (19 July 1698 – 23 May 1762) of Chopwell Hall, Chopwell, formerly County Durham, now Tyne and Wear, was a member of a junior branch of the Clavering family.

He was the son of John Clavering of Chopwell and was a Groom of the Bedchamber at the Court of George II from 1731 to 1761.

He was Member of Parliament for Great Marlow 1727–1731 and Penryn 1734–1741. 

His London address was 8 Burlington Street, where the new house was built for him on a 62-year leasehold in 1734.

He inherited the Chopwell estate from his father and an estate at Potter Newton, near Leeds, from his mother. He died unmarried and bequeathed his property to his nephew, the 2nd Earl Cowper.

References

1698 births
1762 deaths
History of County Durham
Members of the Parliament of Great Britain for English constituencies
Members of the Parliament of Great Britain for constituencies in Cornwall
British MPs 1727–1734
British MPs 1734–1741